Demetrius III was King of the Abkhazia from 967 AD until 975 AD. He was the third son of George II of the Anchabadze dynasty. He succeeded his brother Leon III, who died without a male heir.

Life 
Demetrius III succeeded his brother Leon III, who died without a male heir in 967. The loyalty of nobles to the Abkhazian crown was far from stable. A party of nobles gathered and appealed to his younger brother Theodosius, who lived in exile in Byzantium, to assert his rights to the throne. The pretender and his followers were quickly defeated by Demetrius III. Teodosius first took refuge in the Kartli with certain Adarnase, then with David III of Tao where he remained for a while, and finally moved at the court of Kvirke II of Kakheti. Demetrius III managed to convince Theodosius to organize a reconciliation, who agreed to return to Abkhazia with guarantees of personal security confirmed by oaths before the Catholicos and the clergy. The central government was still powerful enough to cope with the local separatism, but not for surmounting the growing structural crisis. The weakness of the government brought about another act of cruelty. Demetrius caught his brother Theodosius in plotting again and makes blind. This act raises the indignation of his subjects.

Nevertheless, Demetrius too dies childless, and Theodosius Ill the Blind (975-978) becomes the sole heir to the throne of Abkhazia.

Genealogy

Sources 
 Z. Anchabadze, Georgian Soviet Encyclopedia, III, p. 459, Tbilisi, 1978

Demetrius 03